Thallium iodide can refer to:

 Thallium(I) iodide (thallium monoiodide), TlI
 Thallium triiodide, TlI3